Johnny Larsen is a 1979 Danish drama film directed by Morten Arnfred. The film was selected as the Danish entry for the Best Foreign Language Film at the 52nd Academy Awards, but was not accepted as a nominee.

Cast 
  as Johnny Larsen
 Aksel Erhardtsen as Hans' father
 
 Svend Hansson as The blacksmith
 Anne Marie Helger as Bagerjomfru
 Frits Helmuth as Johnnys father
  as Hans
 Ib Mossin as Værkføreren
 Elsebeth Nielsen as Britta, Johnnys girlfriend
  as Oversergenten
 Berthe Qvistgaard as Johnnys grandmother
  as Man Seeking Work
  as Johnny's mother

Accolades 
The film won the 1980 Bodil Award for Best Danish Film.

See also 
 List of submissions to the 52nd Academy Awards for Best Foreign Language Film
 List of Danish submissions for the Academy Award for Best Foreign Language Film

References

External links 
 

1979 drama films
1979 films
Danish drama films
1970s Danish-language films
Films directed by Morten Arnfred
Best Danish Film Bodil Award winners